Montertelot is a commune in the Morbihan department in Brittany in north-western France. It is situated between the cities of Rennes and Vannes, about 6 km from Ploërmel. Inhabitants of Montertelot are called Montertelotais.

See also
Communes of the Morbihan department

References

External links

 Mayors of Morbihan Association 

Communes of Morbihan